Lophoterges is a genus of moths of the family Noctuidae.

Species
 Lophoterges hoerhammeri (Wagner, 1931)
 Lophoterges millierei (Staudinger, 1871)

References
Natural History Museum Lepidoptera genus database
Lophoterges at funet

Cuculliinae